Snatched is a 1973 American made-for-television crime film directed by Sutton Roley and starring Howard Duff, Leslie Nielsen, Sheree North, Barbara Parkins, Robert Reed, John Saxon, Tisha Sterling and Anthony Zerbe.

Plot
The wives of three wealthy men are kidnapped and held for a $3 million ransom-$1 million for each of them. One of the wives, a diabetic, needs her insulin medication or she will soon die. One of the husbands refuses to pay his share of the ransom because he believes that his wife is having an affair with another man. There is also an unseen mastermind behind the kidnapping.

Cast
 Howard Duff as Duncan Wood 
 Leslie Nielsen as Bill Sutter
 Sheree North as Kim Sutter
 Barbara Parkins as Barbara Maxvill 
 Robert Reed as Frank McCloy
 John Saxon as Paul Maxvill
 Tisha Sterling as Robin Wood
 Anthony Zerbe as Boone
 Richard Davalos as Whit
 Frank McRae as Cheech 
 Bart La Rae as Russell (as Bart LaRae)
 Howard Platt as First Detective 
 John Gilgreen as Second Detective

See also
 List of American films of 1973

References

External links

1973 television films
1973 films
American television films
American crime action films
1970s crime action films
Films about kidnapping
Films scored by Randy Edelman
Films shot in Los Angeles
Films directed by Sutton Roley
1970s English-language films
1970s American films